The Iron Duke is a pulp fiction, pre-World War II adventure story written by L. Ron Hubbard. It was first published in the July 1940 issue of the pulp fiction magazine "Five-Novels Monthly".

Plot introduction

The story revolves around Blacky Lee, an American arms merchant who is being pursued by pre-World War II Nazis. Chased across Europe, he makes his way to the kingdom of Aldoria where he impersonates the country's archduke. He is the spitting image of the archduke and has previously studied his background, voice, and mannerisms. Immediately he is caught in political intrigue, romance, and danger.

Inevitably, Blacky is found out and jailed, after which the twists and turns come about as he navigates the country's political landscape.

Publication history
The Iron Duke was written and published in the July 1940 issue of the pulp magazine "Five-Novels Monthly".

The Iron Duke is from the Golden Age series, which Galaxy Press started re-publishing in 2008. The book has been re-released in paperback, with glossaries and an author bio. It is also available as a full-cast audiobook with full sound effects and music, featuring Michael Yurchak. Also stars R.F. Daley, Jim Meskimen, Lori Jablons, and Richard Rocco.

Reviews

Books.Gather.com: Gil T. Wilson

redroom.com: Andrew Blackman

Awards

Audio File Magazine: Best of 2009

References

1940 American novels
Novels by L. Ron Hubbard